Okolnichy was an old Muscovite court official position. According to the Brockhaus and Efron Encyclopedic Dictionary, directives on the position of okolnichy date back to the 14th century. Judging by the Muscovite records from the 16th and 17th centuries, okolnichy were entrusted with the same business in administration as boyars, with the only difference that they were placed second to boyars everywhere. While lower than boyars, it was one of the highest ranks (or positions) close to the tsar in the courts of the Moscow rulers until the government reform undertaken by Peter the Great. 

The word is derived from the Russian word  meaning 'close, near', in this case 'sitting close to the Tsar'. In the mid-16th century the role became second (subordinate) to boyars.

Description
The duties of the first known okolnichies included arranging the travel and quarters of grand princes and tsars, as well as accommodating foreign ambassadors and presenting them to the court.

Okolnichies had a seat in prikazes, were appointed as namestniks (viceroys) and voivodes (generals), served as diplomatic envoys and members of the tsar's council (duma).

Initially their number was very small, but it grew over time and they acquired more duties. An okolnichy could head a state office (prikaz) or a regiment, could be an ambassador or a member of the state duma.

Initially the rank of okolnichy was the second highest after that of boyar, while often they performed similar duties. According to the system of mestnichestvo, a person could not be made a boyar unless someone else in his family had recently held the boyar/okolnichy rank. Consequently, a position of okolnichy was a step towards granting the boyar rank to a non-noble. Even Prince Dmitry Pozharsky, though a Rurikid knyaz by birth and the "Saviour of the Motherland" by royal mercy, could not secure a position higher than okolnichy, because neither his parents nor uncles had ever held a rank higher than stolnik.

Under the Romanovs, the 18 noblest families of Muscovy were given the privilege of starting their official career from the rank of okolnichy, skipping all the lower ranks, such as stolnik. At the same period, the positions of okolnichy were differentiated and some of them (quarters okolnichy or close okolnichy) were of higher rank than that of non-close boyars. The terms derive from a semi-formal ranking based on the proximity to the tsar at the tsar's table.

List of okolnichies

Ivan III of Russia

Vasiliy III of Russia

Ivan the Terrible

Feodor I of Russia, the Blessed

Boris Godunov

False Dmitry I

Vasili IV of Russia Shuiskiy

Michael of Russia

Alexis of Russia

Feodor III of Russia

Ivan V of Russia and Peter the Great

See also
 Voyevoda

References

Court titles
 
Tsardom of Russia